Opaka is a town in Bulɡaria.

Opaka may also refer to:
 Opaka Municipality, a Bulgarian municipality
 Opaka, Poland, a village in Poland
 Opaka Sulan, a fictional character from Star Trek: Deep Space Nine

See also